The Mini Globe Race is a single-handed round-the-world yacht race contested in Class Globe 5.80 yachts. The first edition of the Mini Globe Race is expected to commence in late 2024. The proposed course is westward, starting and finishing in Europe, transiting Panama Canal and rounding the Cape of Good Hope. The race is expected to cover more than 26,000 miles and take 400 days to complete. Final course is not yet determined.
 
The Class Globe 5.80 yacht is designed as an affordable, round-the-world capable single-handed yacht that ships readily inside a standard 20' shipping container. Yacht plans have sold to more than 23 countries, and construction is underway around the world.

Entries opened in August 2021.

Course 

The published course is in four legs, with a seven day stop at each of the intermediate within-leg ports:

Leg 1: Portugal to Canary Islands (800 nm), to Antigua (3000 nm), to Panama (1200 nm). Truck across, keels on, rigs off. (5000 nm leg total)

Leg 2: Panama to Tahiti (4500 nm), to Tonga (1300 nm), to Fiji (600 nm). (6400 nm leg total)

Leg 3: Fiji to Darwin (3000 nm), to Mauritius (4300 nm), to Cape Town (2400 nm). (9700 nm leg total)

Leg 4: Cape Town to St. Helena (1900 nm), to Cape Verde (2400 nm), to Portugal (1600 nm). (5900 miles)

Trophies 
Mini Globe Race Perpetual Trophy for overall winner. 

Individual leg winner for each leg. 

Seniors class (over 60 years old) trophies for overall class winner and individual leg class winner. 

The McIntyre Adventure Spirit of the MGR trophy will be presented to the most deserving entrant finishing.

Initially publicized race proposal 
The initial publicity for the Mini Globe Race, beginning in April 2020, included the course and related trophies detailed below These were subsequently changed with publication of the pre-notice of race:

Course 
The proposed course is

Leg 1: Portugal to Canary Islands (800 nm), 4 day stop, to Caribbean (2700 nm), 7 day stop, to Panama (1200 nm).

Leg 2: Panama to Marquesas (3800 nm), 7 day stop, to Tahiti (800 nm).

Leg 3: Tahiti to Tonga (1400 nm).

Leg 4: Tonga to Kupang, Indonesia (3800 nm).

Leg 5: Kupang to Mauritius (3800 nm), 7 day stop, to Cape Town (2400, nm).

Leg 6: Cape Town to Cape Verde (4000 nm), 7 day stop, to Portugal.

Trophies 
Individual trophies are awarded for:

“Logical Route” trophy for first vessel from Europe to Tahiti (referencing Bernard Moitessier's "la longue route" voyage to Tahiti in Joshua).

“Bounty Challenge” trophy to winner of Leg 4 Tonga to Kupang, Indonesia (after William Bligh's open boat voyage following the Mutiny on the Bounty).

References 

Round-the-world sailing competitions
Single-handed sailing competitions
Single-handed sailing
Sailing competitions